Intangible cultural heritage (ICH) includes traditions and living expressions that are passed down from generation to generation within a particular community.

The Philippines, with the National Commission for Culture and the Arts as the de facto Ministry of Culture, ratified the 2003 Convention after its formal deposit in August 2006. This implies that there is an obligation to carry out the objectives of the convention to ensure the safeguarding of intangible cultural heritage. This includes identifying and documenting viable ICH elements, safeguarding and promoting viable ICH, fostering scientific, technical and artistic studies, and provide technical assistance and training in the field of ICH.

Prior to the 2003 Convention, the Philippines was invited by UNESCO to nominate intangible heritage elements for the inclusion to the Proclamation of Masterpieces of the Oral and Intangible Heritage of Humanity. This prompted the proclamation of the Hudhud chant of the Ifugao in 2001 and Darangen epic chant of the Maranao in 2005. After the establishment of the 2003 Convention, all entries to the Proclamation of Masterpieces were incorporated in the Representative List of Intangible Cultural Heritage of Humanity in 2008. A third inscription was made in 2015 through a multinational nomination between Cambodia, the Philippines, the Republic of Korea, and Viet Nam for the Tugging Rituals and Games, wherein the punnuk tugging ritual of the Ifugao was included.

As part of the objective of the 2003 Convention, the National Commission for Culture and the Arts through the Intangible Cultural Heritage unit and in partnership with ICHCAP, published the Pinagmulan: Enumeration from the Philippine Inventory of Intangible Cultural Heritage in 2012. The publication contains an initial inventory of 335 ICH elements with elaborate discussions on 109 ICH elements. The elements listed are the first batch of continuous updating process initiated by the government, UNESCO, and other stakeholders. In 2014, the Pinagmulan was a finalist under the category of the Elfren S. Cruz Prize for Best Book in the Social Sciences in the National Book Awards organized by the National Book Development Board. The Philippine inventory is currently being updated as a measure to safeguard more intangible cultural heritage elements in the country. The updating began in 2013 and results may be released in 5–10 years after the scientific process finishes the second batch of element documentations. According to UNESCO, it is not expected by a country or state party to have a completed inventory. On the contrary, the development and updating of inventories is an ongoing process that can never be finished.

Between 2015 and 2017, UNESCO's Intangible Cultural Heritage Courier of Asia and the Pacific featured the darangen epic chant, punnuk tugging ritual, and at least three kinds of traditional healing practices in the Philippines, including the manghihilot and albularyo healing practices and belief of buhay na tubig (living water) of the Tagalog people of 20th century Quezon city, the baglan and mandadawak healing practices and stone beliefs of the Itneg people in Abra, and the mantatawak healing practices of the Tagalog people of Marinduque.

By 2016, according to the ICH Unit, National Commission for Culture and the Arts, there were 367 elements listed under the Philippine Inventory of Intangible Cultural Heritage (PIICH), the official ICH inventory of the Philippines. All elements under the PIICH are listed in Philippine Registry of Cultural Property (PRECUP), the official cultural property inventory of the country, which includes both tangible and intangible cultural properties. In April 2018, the buklog of the Subanen people was nominated by the National Commission for Culture and the Arts in the list for urgent safeguarding.

National Living Treasures
As defined by UNESCO, the bearers of intangible cultural heritage are to be known internationally as Living Human Treasures. The Filipino counterparts of this title are the Gawad sa Manlilikha ng Bayan (GAMABA) awardees. There are currently sixteen declared GAMABA awardees, all of which have exemplified the highest standard in their respective field of expertise. The award is only given to individuals or groups that have exhibited the highest possible standard in intangible cultural heritage. A master of the heritage does not automatically qualify an individual or group for the award as the craft of the master should exude a higher meaning to the highest standard set by the highly critical council of the GAMABA board. Due to this lengthy and critical process, most masters are not yet declared as GAMABA awardees. The National Living Treasures of the Philippines are as follow:
 Ginaw Bilog (d. 2003), artist and poet, Mansalay, Oriental Mindoro Poetry (Ambahan), 1993
 Masino Intaray (d. 2013), musician and epic chanter, Brookes Point, Palawan, Poetry (Kulilal and Bagit)Music (Basal / Gong), 1993
 Samaon Sulaiman (d. 2011), Musician, Mama sa Pano, Maguindanao Music (Kutyapi), 1993
 Lang Dulay, (d. 2015) textile weaver, Lake Sebu, South Cotabato, Weaving (T'nalak), 1998
 Salinta Monon (d. 2009), weaver, Bansalan, Davao del Sur, Weaving (Abaca – ikat / Inabal), 1998
 Alonzo Saclag, musician and dancer, Lubugan, Kalinga Province, Music and Dance (Kalinga), 2000
 Frederico Caballero, epic chanter, Sulod- Bukidnon, Iloilo, Poetry / Epic Chant (Sugidanon), 2000
 Uwang Ahadas, musician, Lamitan, Basilan, music (Yakan specifically Kulintang, kwitangan kayu, gabbang, agung, and tuntungan), 2000
 Darhata Sawabi, (d. 2005), weaver, Parang, Sulu, weaving (Pis Syabit), 2004
 Eduardo Mutuc, metalsmith / metal sculptor, Apalit, Pampanga, Metalwork (Bronze and Silver), 2004
 Haja Amina Appi (d. 2013), weaver, Tandubas, Tawi-Tawi, Weaving (Mat), 2004
 Teofilo Garcia, casque maker, San Quintin, Abra, Casque Making (Tabungaw), 2012
 Magdalena Gamayo, master weaver, Pinili, Ilocos Norte, Weaving (Inabel), 2012
 Ambalang Ausalin, master weaver, Lamitan, Basilan, Weaving (Yakan tennun), 2016
 Estelita Tumandan Bantilan, master weaver, Malapatan, Sarangani, Weaving (B'laan igem), 2016
 Yabing Masalon Dulo, master weaver, Polomolok, South Cotabato, Weaving (Ikat), 2016

UNESCO-inscribed ICH of the Philippines

The Philippines currently has a total of three intangible cultural heritage elements inscribed in the UNESCO Representative List of the Intangible Cultural Heritage of Humanity. These are the Darangen epic of the Maranao people of Lake Lanao, Hudhud chants of the Ifugao, and Punnuk, tugging rituals and games.

Proposed/ongoing nominations by the Philippines

Numerous elements are being proposed for nomination by the Philippines for inclusion in the intangible cultural heritage lists within the coming few years. Among these elements are:
Kapayvanuvanuwa Fishing Ritual of the Ivatan of Batanes
Batek/Batok Tattoo-making Tradition of the Butbut People of Kalinga
Ati-atihan festival of the people of Aklan
Metal and wood craftsmanship of the Maranao of Lanao
Tepo mat weaving of the Sama people of Tawi-tawi
Traditional Boatbuilding and Maritime Culture of the peoples of Batanes and Tawi-tawi
Tradition of Atang of the Ilocano people
Cosmology of the Mangyans of Mindoro
Moriones festival of the people of Marinduque
Hinilawod Epics of the people of Panay
Ulaging Epic of the Talaandig Manobo of Bukidnon
Kudaman Epic of the Pala'wan people of Palawan
Buklog rituals of the Subanen people of Zamboanga Peninsula
Apung Iru fluvial festival of the Kapampangan people of Apalit
Kalibo piña weaving of the Aklanon people of Aklan
Digdiga Ni Tupayya courtship dance of the Kalinga people.

The Philippines is a member of the committee on intangible cultural heritage since 2016, and will end its term in 2019. In 2017, the Ambassador of the Philippines to France and UNESCO urged the Philippine government to nominate the Metal and wood craftsmanship of the Maranao of Lanao in the list in need for urgent safeguarding for 2018. On February 20, 2018, the government and the stakeholders of Aklan met for the preparation of the dossier of the Kalibo piña weaving intangible cultural heritage. Additionally, on April 9, 2018, the NCCA nominated the buklog rituals of the Subanen people to the list in need for urgent safeguarding. UNESCO set the nomination of buklog for the 2019 inscription cycle.

Intangible Cultural Heritage of the Philippines according to the Pinagmulan
The National Commission for Culture and the Arts through its UNESCO-backed Pinagmulan book, inventory of Philippine intangible cultural heritage initiated the first part of the country's intangible heritage inventory. Elements highlighted with light blue are UNESCO-inscribed intangible heritage, while elements highlighted in red are UNESCO-inscribed elements that are in need of urgent safeguarding. Presently, there are 367 elements listed under the Philippine Inventory of Intangible Cultural Heritage (PIICH), which is under the Philippine Registry of Cultural Property (PRECUP). According to UNESCO, intangible cultural heritage has five domains, namely: oral traditions and expressions, including language as a vehicle of the intangible cultural heritage; performing arts; social practices, rituals and festive events; knowledge and practices concerning nature and the universe; and traditional craftsmanship.

Indigenous groups
The Indigenous peoples of the Philippines consist of a large number of Austronesian ethnic groups, as well as Negritos. They are the bearers of the majority of intangible cultural heritage elements deemed as significant to the Filipino psyche. They are the descendants of the original Austronesian inhabitants of the Philippines, that settled in the islands thousands of years ago, and in the process have retained their Indigenous customs and traditions.

In 1990, more than 100 highland peoples constituted approximately three percent of the Philippine population. Over the centuries, the isolated highland peoples have retained their indigenous cultures. The folk arts of these groups were, in a sense, the last remnants of Indigenous traditions that flourished throughout the Philippines before the Islamic and Spanish contacts.

The highland peoples are a primitive ethnic group like other Filipinos, although they did not, as a group, have as much contact with the outside world. These peoples displayed a variety of native cultural expressions and artistic skills. They showed a high degree of creativity such as the production of bowls, baskets, clothing, weapons and spoons. These peoples ranged from various groups of Igorot people, a group that includes the Bontoc, Ibaloi, Ifugao, Isneg, Kalinga and Kankana-ey, who built the Rice Terraces thousands of years ago. They have also covered a wide spectrum in terms of their integration and acculturation with Christian Filipinos. Other Indigenous peoples include the Lumad peoples of the highlands of Mindanao. These groups have remained isolated from Western and Eastern influences.

Due to the influx of Christianity, Islam, and other world religions in traditional communities, the indigenous practices, rituals, and spiritual performances and knowledge of indigenous Filipinos are fast disappearing. Cultural workers in the country suggest the Paiwan Model, which was made by the Taiwanese government to preserve indigenous religions, to save the Philippines' own indigenous religions. The indigenous practices and shamanism of the Paiwan people of Taiwan was the fastest declining religion in the country. This prompted the Taiwanense government to preserve the religion and to push for the establishment of the Paiwan School of Shamanism where religious leaders teach their apprentices the native religion so that it will never be lost. It became an effective medium in preserving, and even uplifting the Paiwan people's indigenous religion. In the Philippines, shamanism is referred as dayawism, meaning 'gallant religions that give thanks to all living and non-living things'. As of 2018, there is no established school of dayawism in the Philippines, making the hundreds of indigenous religions in the country in great peril from extinction due to the influx of colonial-era religions. Each indigenous religion in the Philippines is distinct from each other, possessing unique epics, pantheons, belief systems, and other intangible heritage pertaining to religious beliefs. Due to this immense diversity in indigenous religions, a singular school of dayawism is not feasible. Rather, hundreds of schools of dayawism pertaining to an ethno-linguistic tribe is a better supplement to the current religious landscape in the Philippines.

Domain 1: Oral Traditions and Expressions, including Language

Domain 2: Performing Arts

Domain 3: Social Practices, Rituals, and Festive Events

Domain 4: Knowledge and Practices Concerning Nature and the Universe

Domain 5: Traditional Craftsmanship

See also
 List of Cultural Properties of the Philippines
 List of World Heritage Sites in the Philippines
 National Living Treasures Award (Philippines)
 Art in the Philippines

References 

Philippines
Heritage registers in the Philippines